The Banca di Credito Sardo S.p.A. was an Italian bank headquartered in Cagliari, Sardinia. In 2014 it was absorbed by the parent company Intesa Sanpaolo.

The head office building, located in Cagliari, was designed by the Italian architect Renzo Piano.

History
Credito Industriale Sardo, ente di diritto pubblico con personalità giuridica propria, was established in 1953 as one of the 19 Mediocredito of Italy, as well as one of the three Istituti per il Finanziamento a Medio Terminealle Medie e Piccole Industrie nell'Italia Meridionale e Insulare (Istituti Meridionale), which were funded by Cassa per il Mezzogiorno. The bank provided medium term loans to small and medium industries from the island.

Due to Legge Amato, the bank became a limited company in 1992. The bank renamed into Banca CIS in the 1990s.

In February 2009 the 93 branches of Intesa Sanpaolo and Banca CIS were merged to form Banca di Credito Sardo. At the same time the core business (medium term lending to enterprises) was transferred to Mediocredito Italiano (ex-Mediocredito Lombardo). However, Banca di Credito Sardo was absorbed into Intesa Sanpaolo in 2014.

See also

 Banco di Sardegna

References

External links
 

Defunct banks of Italy
Former Intesa Sanpaolo subsidiaries
Banks established in 1953
Italian companies established in 1953
Banks disestablished in 2014
Italian companies disestablished in 2014
Companies based in Cagliari
Formerly government-owned companies of Italy